Alexander Anderson was a British slave trader, who was in business with his brother Sir John Anderson, together forming John and Alexander Anderson & Co.

They owned a slave factory on Bance Island, Sierra Leone Their business was based in Philpot Lane, Eastcheap. Alexander was active politically to prevent any restrictions in the running of the slave trade, for example working with his brother to organise a petition to the House of Lords in 1799.

References

Scottish slave traders
Year of birth missing
Place of birth missing
Year of death missing